Panayiota Grivastopoulos (born March 18, 1943 in Paris, France) is a French-Greek soap opera actress.

Background
She is best known for her roles on the now defunct long running Greek soap operas, Kalimera Zoi, and Lampsi on the ANT1 network, she will also temporarily join the cast of Erotas later this year, which coincidentally her daughter Vera Kondos guest stars in. It was confirmed that she will be playing a villain. She suffers from osteoporosis and osteo-arthritis. In 2006 she discovered that her year of birth had been miscounted, instead of being born in 1942 she was in fact born in 1943.

References

1943 births
Living people
Greek soap opera actresses
Actresses from Paris